The 1993 Ansett Australian Indoor Championships was a men's tennis tournament played on indoor hard courts at the Sydney Entertainment Centre in Sydney, Australia and was part of the Championship Series of the 1993 ATP Tour. It was the 21st edition of the tournament and was held from 4 through 11 October 1993. Unseeded Jaime Yzaga won the singles title.

Finals

Singles

 Jaime Yzaga defeated  Petr Korda 6–4, 4–6, 7–6(7–4), 7–6(9–7)
 It was Yzaga's 2nd title of the year and the 8th of his career.

Doubles

 Patrick McEnroe /  Richey Reneberg defeated  Alexander Mronz /  Lars Rehmann 6–3, 7–5
 It was McEnroe's 3rd title of the year and the 12th of his career. It was Reneberg's 4th title of the year and the 12th of his career.

References

External links
 International Tennis Federation (ITF) – tournament edition details